Secret Asset is a novel by Stella Rimington, released in 2006.

Plot
The story, the second in the 'Liz Carlyle' series, is initially divided between two threads: The suspicion of an unactivated IRA mole within MI5, and a potential, terrorist threat reported by an unpaid agent. As the book progresses, the two sub threads begin to intertwine and merge.

References

2006 British novels
Hutchinson (publisher) books
MI5 in fiction